Highball Roller is the debut album by punk rock group Sorry and the Sinatras on May 11, 2009 through UnderGroove Records. The group recorded the album in less than three weeks in Barnsley, United Kingdom with producer Jason Sanderson in September, 2008

Track listing
All lyrics and music by Sorry and the Sinatras

Personnel
Sorry and the Sinatras
Scott Sorry – vocals, rhythm guitar
Dave Kerr – lead guitar, backing vocals
Roger "Rags" Segal – bass, backing vocals
Lenny Thomas – drums

Production personnel
Jason Sanderson – production, mixing, mastering

References

2009 debut albums
Sorry and the Sinatras albums